Leslie Paul Thiele is a professor at the University of Florida. Dr. Thiele focuses on the intersection of politics and sustainability. In addition to his academic work, he serves as the director for the Center for Adaptive Resilience, Ethics and Science at the University of Florida.

References

Year of birth missing (living people)
Living people
University of Florida faculty
Princeton University alumni
American political scientists